Si Tianfeng (Sī Tiānfēng, born June 17, 1984, in Xintai, Shandong) is a Chinese race walker. He represented China at the 2008 Beijing Olympics, finishing 17th. He also competed in the 50 km walk at the 2009 Chinese National Games and won the bronze medal. Si set a Games record to take the gold medal in the 50 km walk at the 2010 Asian Games. He was fourth at the World Race Walking Cup that year.

He won the Taicang meet on the IAAF Race Walking Challenge in April 2011, but came fourth that was retrospectively upgraded to bronze after the original gold medalist was caught doping at the World Championships that year.

At the 2012 Summer Olympics, he won the silver medal in the men's 50 km race walk, in a personal best of 3:37:16.  In May 2012, he also won bronze at the World Racing Cup in Saransk retrospectively upgraded to silver medal after the original gold medalist was disqualified for doping.

Achievements

See also 
China at the 2012 Summer Olympics - Athletics
Athletics at the 2012 Summer Olympics – Men's 50 kilometres walk

References

1984 births
Living people
Chinese male racewalkers
Athletes (track and field) at the 2008 Summer Olympics
Athletes (track and field) at the 2012 Summer Olympics
Olympic athletes of China
Asian Games medalists in athletics (track and field)
Athletes from Shandong
People from Tai'an
Athletes (track and field) at the 2010 Asian Games
Medalists at the 2012 Summer Olympics
Olympic silver medalists for China
Olympic silver medalists in athletics (track and field)
Asian Games gold medalists for China
Medalists at the 2010 Asian Games